Corbins is a municipality in the comarca of the Segrià in Catalonia, Spain. It is situated at the confluence of the Segre and Noguera Ribagorçana rivers and is linked to Lleida by a local road running parallel to the Segre.

Demography

References

 Panareda Clopés, Josep Maria; Rios Calvet, Jaume; Rabella Vives, Josep Maria (1989). Guia de Catalunya, Barcelona: Caixa de Catalunya.  (Spanish).  (Catalan).

External links 
Official website 
 Government data pages 

Municipalities in Segrià
Populated places in Segrià